Oncideres putator is a species of beetle in the family Cerambycidae. It was described by James Thomson in 1868.

Subspecies
 Oncideres putator brevifasciatus Dillon & Dillon, 1946
 Oncideres putator putator Thomson, 1868

References

putator
Beetles described in 1868